Ancistrocerus trifasciatus  is a Palearctic species of potter wasp.

References

External links
Images representing Ancistrocerus trifasciatus

Hymenoptera of Europe
Potter wasps
Insects described in 1776
Taxa named by Philipp Ludwig Statius Müller